Márton Fucsovics was the defending champion, but he did not participate that year.

Ričardas Berankis won the title, after Nikoloz Basilashvili retired in the final, winning 6–4, 1–0, ret.

Seeds

  Igor Sijsling (first round)
  Dustin Brown (withdrew)
  Ričardas Berankis (champion)
  Blaž Kavčič (first round)
  Marsel İlhan (first round)
  Damir Džumhur (first round)
  Dudi Sela (withdrew)
  Jimmy Wang (second round, withdrew)
  Farrukh Dustov (withdrew)

Draw

Finals

Top half

Bottom half

References
 Main Draw
 Qualifying Draw

Internazionali di Tennis Castel del Monte - Singles
2014 Singles
2014 in Italian tennis